Stena Voyager was a high-speed ferry owned by Stena Line which used to operate on their Belfast–Stranraer service. It was a member of the HSS 1500 class of high-speed ferries developed and introduced by Stena Line from 1996 onwards.

In 2013, Stena Voyager was sold for scrap. It was towed to Landskrona, Sweden, where was broken up by Stena Recycling, another member of Stena Sphere.

Design 

The vessel was a catamaran, and was designed with the aim of providing a comfortable and fast service. The sailing time between Belfast and Stranraer was 119 minutes.

Power was provided by four GE Aviation gas turbines in a twin combined gas and gas (COGAG) configuration. The vessel employed four Kamewa waterjets for propulsion.

The HSS class of ferries were designed to allow quick turnarounds at port. A specially designed linkspan provided ropeless mooring and allowed quick loading, unloading and servicing. Vehicles were loaded via two of the four stern doors and parked in a "U" configuration. When disembarking, vehicles drove straight off via the other two doors.

History

Construction 
Stena Voyager was constructed by Finnyards in Rauma, Finland. Construction commenced in May 1995 and was completed in June 1996, before entering service in July 1996.

Career
Stena Voyager spent the majority of her career sailing on her original route between Belfast and Stranraer, apart from short periods covering for her sister ships.

Incidents
On 28 January 2009, a lorry carrying ferrous sulphate powder burst through the stern doors of the Stena Voyager shortly after departure. Because of this, the ferry had to return to Stranraer. Subsequent sailings were postponed. 
The cause of the accident was the driver of the lorry failing to park it in gear and to apply the handbrake. The vehicle was insufficiently secured to the ship's deck.

Uncertain future
During 2010, Stena Line was beginning the process of transfer operations from Stranraer Port to a new port facility at Cairnryan, five miles further north up Loch Ryan.  The new port at Old Light House Point was to be called Loch Ryan Port.  Planning application materials submitted in 2008 stated that a pair of new conventional Ropax ferries operating at  would take over all operations on the service, replacing the operations of Stena Voyager and the conventional ferry .  The new pair of vessels would provide a passage time of 2 hours between Scotland and Belfast and be fitted out with "passenger facilities similar to an HSS".  No HSS-compatible linkspan was planned to be provided at the new port.

In March 2011, Stena Line announced the Stena Voyager and her running partners on the Belfast – Stranraer route (Stena Caledonia and Stena Navigator) were to be replaced in Autumn 2011 by the Stena Superfast VII and Stena Superfast VIII chartered from Estonian ferry operator Tallink. Stena Voyager was widthdrawn from service on 20 November 2011 and was laid up in Belfast until 2013.

Scrapping

In April 2013, it was reported that Stena Voyager had been sold for scrapping. She was towed to Landskrona, Sweden, where the vessel was broken up by Stena Recycling.

In media
In 2009, Stena Voyager appeared in the BBC television series Top Gear. Jeremy Clarkson, ostensibly having missed the ferry, tried to leapfrog a Renault Twingo on the departing Stena Voyager. The car sank into the wash behind the departing ferry.  Actor Ross Kemp was supposedly locked in the boot of the car that Clarkson was seen driving.

See also 
 List of multihulls

References

Ferries of Northern Ireland
Ferries of Scotland
Ships built in Rauma, Finland
1996 ships
Voyager
High-speed craft